is a Japanese actor, best known for the role of Gunpei Ishihara/Go-on Black in the 2008 tokusatsu series Engine Sentai Go-onger.

Filmography

Television
 Mirai Souzoudou as Kazuo Watanabe (NTV, 2006)
 Uramiya Honpo as Kazuo Misato (TV Tokyo, 2006)
 Picnic no Junbi (2006)
 Shinuka to Omotta in Case 3 (NTV, 2007)
 Top Caster (Fuji TV, 2006)
 Kami wa Saikoro wo Furanai (NTV, 2006)
 Engine Sentai Go-onger as Gunpei Ishihara/Go-On Black (TV Asahi, 2008)
 Yako no Kaidan as Jun Hasegawa (TV Asahi, 2009)
 Ikemen Sobaya Tantei~Iin da ze!~ as Kenji (Nihon TV, 2009)
 Ikemen Shin Sobaya Tantei~Iin da ze!~ as Kenji (Nihon TV 2009)
 Zyuden Sentai Kyoryuger as Shiro Mifune (TV Asahi, 2013)

Cinema
 Yoru no Picnic (2006)
 Engine Sentai Go-onger: Boom Boom! Bang Bang! GekijōBang!! (2008 Toei) as Gunpei Ishihara/Go-On Black
 Engine Sentai Go-onger vs. Gekiranger (2009 Toei) as Gunpei Ishihara/Go-On Black
 Samurai Sentai Shinkenger vs. Go-onger: GinmakuBang!! (2010 Toei) as Gunpei Ishihara/Go-On Black

Other media

Stage
 GODSPELL (2005)
 Sophistry (2006)

Endorsements
 Nivea-KAO
 Aoyama Trading
 NTT DoCoMo

External links
Official profile at Cube Inc
Ebisawa's official blog
Wikipedia Japanese article on 海老澤健次

1986 births
Living people
Japanese male television actors